

The SC-497-class submarine chasers were a class of 438 submarine chasers built primarily for the United States Navy from 1941–1944.  The SC-497s were based on the experimental submarine chaser, USS SC-453. Submarine chasers of this variety were collectively nicknamed "the splinter fleet" due to their wooden hulls.

History
The SC-497s were off-shore patrol and anti-submarine warfare vessels. Seventy of the SC-497s were converted into patrol control crafts (SCC), 18 were converted into coastal minesweepers (AMC), and 8 were converted into patrol gunboats, motor (PGM).

Despite the large number of SC-497s, none are credited with destroying an enemy ship. (USS SC-669 is sometimes incorrectly credited with sinking the Japanese submarine RO-107 on 29 May 1943, but RO-107 was still active on 6 July 1943.)  

During World War II, 142 SC-497-class submarine chasers were lent to allies of the United States as part of the Lend-Lease program. Seventy-eight were sent to the Soviet Union, 50 to France, 8 to Brazil, 3 to Norway, and 3 to Mexico. The three Norwegian examples served with distinction on the Shetland bus service, running agents, refugees and weapons past the German blockade between occupied Norway and Britain.

Survivors
 (ex-USS SC-718) is preserved at the Royal Norwegian Navy Museum.

USS SC 772 is a liveaboard vessel in Scappoose, Oregon in the Multnomah Slough near Sauvie Island.

See also
 
 
 List of patrol vessels of the United States Navy

References